Andrew Myung Stroup (born May 22, 1985) is an engineer and entrepreneur, best known as a participant on the first season of the Discovery Channel's The Big Brain Theory. He currently is the founder of LVRG.

Early life 

Stroup was born in Seoul, South Korea and at the age of four months old, was adopted by an Oklahoma family (David and Jimmye Stroup). He grew up in Sand Springs, a suburb of Tulsa, Oklahoma, where he attended and graduated as valedictorian from Charles Page High School in 2003. He attended Oklahoma State University and graduated in 2009 with two B.S. degrees in aerospace engineering and mechanical engineering from the College of Engineering, Architecture, and Technology with focuses in mathematics and business management. During his Senior year (2008-2009) at Oklahoma State University, he co-led Team Black, an engineering team of 15 students, that placed first in the American Institute of Aeronautics and Astronautics Design/Build/Fly competition, hosted in Tucson, Arizona.

Career

Professional career 

Starting in 2006, he served as a project engineering manager for BarDyne, Inc., a fluid power engineering and consultant firm based in Stillwater, OK that originated from the Fluid Power Research Center (Oklahoma State University). During this time, he worked with organizations that spanned multiple industries, to include Walt Disney Imagineering, supporting their California Screamin' roller coaster in Anaheim, California, and General Dynamics Amphibious Systems in Woodbridge, Virginia on the Expeditionary Fighting Vehicle program, developed for the United States Marine Corps.

In 2009, Stroup relocated to Washington, D.C. to serve as a subject-matter expert (SME) defense contractor for the Department of Defense CBRN defense portfolio, specifically on aerospace platform integration efforts, to include the Joint Strike Fighter program. Mid 2011 he joined the Department of Defense civilian workforce through an insourcing initiative, where his roles and responsibilities shifted towards supporting the military medical community and the development of vaccines and drugs as medical countermeasures for the United States Armed Forces. His final position was an Informatics SME and Integration Lead on a White House Presidential Executive Order initiative called Biosurveillance.

From October 2012 to March 2015, he served as the CEO of an internet security tech startup called CommonKey that provided a cloud-based identity and access management solution for small and medium enterprises through a software as a service management dashboard paired with a browser extension that provided single sign-on functionality. In June 2014 and until January 2015, Stroup became a co-founder of MegaBots, Inc. where he focused on fluid power design, fabrication, and business development and operations.

In March 2015 he became the Director of Product and Technology for the White House Presidential Innovation Fellows, which is a competitive fellowship program that pairs top innovators from the private sector, non-profits, and academia with top innovators in government to collaborate on solutions that aim to deliver significant results in condensed timelines (four to twelve months). Afterwards, he transitioned into the financial services industry when he served as an Entrepreneur in Residence within the Global Information Security organization at Bank of America Merrill Lynch, leading a Technology Strategy and Business Enablement team.

Stroup currently serves as the founder and CEO of Leverage, an AI-driven supply chain management platform.

Additionally, he serves as an Advisory Board Member at Exygy, Entrepreneur in Residence at Oklahoma State University, Mentor at Entrepreneurs Roundtable Accelerator and Technology and Information Security Advisor for Human Rights Watch.

TV career 

In 2013, Stroup appeared in the first season of Discovery Channel's reality TV series The Big Brain Theory: Pure Genius, an engineering competition consisting of 10 contestants from across the country, which aired from May to June 2013. Each week contestants were put to the test, competing against each other in two teams to design, build, and deliver solutions to difficult engineering problems. He survived six out of eight episodes. To promote the show he appeared in a series of interviews prior to and during the airing of the TV series.

Philanthropic interests 

Stroup, along with Corey Fleischer, another contestant and winner of The Big Brain Theory, and Jason Hardebeck founded the Baltimore Foundery in 2013, a nonprofit organization makerspace (ref hackerspace) that focuses on providing access to industrial grade tools and education in the heart of Baltimore. Additionally, Stroup serves as a Trustee for the Awesome Foundation, which provide small grants for projects to people devoted to forwarding the interest of awesomeness in the universe.

During the COVID-19 pandemic, with the unprecedented shortage of personal protective equipment (PPE) for healthcare workers and frontline responders, Stroup founded the nonprofit organization Project N95 to help healthcare providers and frontline workers source PPE from vetted suppliers.

According to their website, the mission of Project N95 is to “deliver critical equipment to frontline workers as quickly as possible by driving transparency in the market and procurement best practices.” Alongside the team of volunteers around the world, key support was provided by leading figures like Andy Slavitt and Mark Cuban.

References

External links 

 

1985 births
Living people
American aerospace engineers
Oklahoma State University alumni
Participants in American reality television series
People from Seoul